Thomas Henry Blythe (born Thomas Williams; 1822–1883), was a Welsh-born American businessman; he became a successful self-made capitalist and tycoon after emigrating to San Francisco in the United States. Blythe is most remembered for purchasing, developing, and subdividing the Palo Verde Valley in southern California, and obtaining primary rights to Colorado River water to irrigate the valley. The city of Blythe, California, the largest city in the Palo Verde Valley, is named for him.

Biography 
Born on July 22, 1822, in Mold, Flintshire, Wales.

The city of Blythe, California, the largest city in the Palo Verde Valley, is named for him.

At the time of Blythe's death his estate was estimated to be worth around four million dollars. He died suddenly, and unexpectedly, without any family in the United States, and without a will or other instructions regarding his estate. Almost 200 people initially claimed to be his legitimate heirs, including three women each professing to be his wife.  Litigation of the estate spanned more than 25 years, but ultimately the entire estate was awarded to Blythe's illegitimate daughter, Florence Blythe.

Honors and tributes
The city of Blythe, California, originally named Blythe City by Blythe himself, still bears his name.
Other places and organizations bearing Thomas Henry Blythe's name:
Blythe Airport
Blythe Heat
Blythe Intaglios
Blythe Intake
Blythe Mesa Solar Power Project
Blythe Photovoltaic Power Plant

See also
Colonia Lerdo

References

Bibliography
 Brown and Boyd, (John Brown Jr and James Boyd), History of San Bernardino and Riverside Counties, The Western Historical Association, 1922, Copyright: The Lewis Publishing Company, Chicago, Ill.
 Gunther, Jane Davies. Riverside County, California, Place Names; Their Origins and Their Stories, Riverside, CA, 1984. LOC catalog number: 84–72920.

19th-century American businesspeople
Businesspeople from San Francisco
American venture capitalists
Blythe, California
History of Riverside County, California
Water in California
Welsh businesspeople
Welsh emigrants to the United States
People from Mold, Flintshire
People from San Francisco
1822 births
1883 deaths
Burials at Woodlawn Memorial Park Cemetery (Colma, California)